Tami Heide, "The girl with two first names," is an American radio personality.  Heide started out as a disc jockey on Emerson College station WERS in Boston, Massachusetts in 1977.  She later served as music director of Massachusetts Institute of Technology station WMBR. Heide worked at WBCN in Boston from 1984 to 1991, then took over the afternoon show at KROQ-FM in Los Angeles, California. In 2005, she moved to KCBS-FM (Jack FM) in Los Angeles, where she was responsible for writing much of the dialogue for the on-air voice. Heide left KCBS-FM in November 2016. In June 2017, she joined Los Angeles smooth R&B station KTWV for weekends and fill-in-work. Heide's mother was American feminist author and social activist Wilma Scott Heide.

Radio affiliation
1977–79: WERS
1979–84: WMBR
1984–91: WBCN
1991–2004: KROQ-FM
2005–16: KCBS-FM
2017-: KTWV

References

American radio DJs
Radio personalities from Boston
Radio personalities from Los Angeles
Year of birth missing (living people)
Living people